Abramov (male) and Abramova (female) (the form Abramoff is also used among emigrants) are old Russian surnames originating around the 16th century. Variations of the former calendar name Avraam. The surname was common among all social estates and covered the whole territory of the Russian Empire. Sometimes it derived from patronymic. It was also adopted by Jews following the Partitions of Poland and usually meant "the son of Abram". As it is not allowed to share the same name as a living father, a son whose father was named Abraham would be called Abram as a stand-in for Abraham.

People with the surname Abramov:
 Alexander Abramov (born 1959), Russian businessman
 Alexander Konstantinovich Abramov (1836–1886), Russian general
 Aleksey Abramov (born 1988), Russian footballer
 Fyodor Abramov (1920–1983), Russian novelist and literary critic
 Georgi Abramov, Russian soloist with the Alexandrov Ensemble
 Ivan A. Abramov, Russian soloist with the Alexandrov Ensemble
 Nikolay Abramov (1950–2005), Soviet footballer
 Nikolay Abramov (1961–2016), Russian ethnic Vepsian writer, translator, journalist and poet
 Nikolay Abramov (1984–2011), Russian footballer
 Pavel Abramov (born 1979), Russian volleyball player
 Sergey Abramov (born 1972), Russian politician
 Valeriy Abramov (1956–2016), Soviet long-distance runner

People with the surname Abramova:
 Nina Abramova (born 1949), Russian rower
 Yekaterina Abramova (born 1982), Russian speed skater

People with the surname Abramoff:
 Jack Abramoff (born 1958), American political lobbyist, served prison time for fraud
 Michael Abramoff (born 1963), American ophthalmologist

Other:
 Abramov Garden – a hill, in Jerusalem, Israel
 Abramov, Volgograd Oblast

References 

 

Russian-language surnames
Jewish surnames